Diocese of the West can refer to:
 The Anglican Diocese of All Nations, once part of the Church of Nigeria North American Mission under the name Anglican Diocese of the West and now a member of the Anglican Church in North America
 The former Reformed Episcopal Diocese of the West, now a convocation of the ACNA Missionary Diocese of All Saints
 The Orthodox Church in America Diocese of the West
 La Diócesis del Occidente (the Diocese of the West, also known as the Diocese of Western Mexico) in of the Anglican Church of Mexico